William David Hislop (born 1993 in London, England) is a British actor, writer and stand-up comedian. He is the son of Private Eye editor Ian Hislop and his wife Victoria.

Hislop studied at Tonbridge School followed by the University of Oxford and alongside Barney Fishwick formed a comedy double act called Giants. In 2017 the 23-year-old won the UK's Musical Comedy Awards.

In 2020, Hislop's "your aunt on the NHS clap" tweet went viral, gaining 4.2 million views on the platform. He also features in a number of videos such as "When you pretend you're not posh", featuring Hislop as a privately-educated individual downplaying his privileged upbringing (reverse snobbery) and "Sexy guy", which is filmed at the Radcliffe Camera at Oxford.

References

External links
 

1993 births
Living people
English male comedians
English actors
Alumni of the University of Oxford